Lusty Beg Island is an island located in Lower Lough Erne, in County Fermanagh, Northern Ireland.

See also 
 List of townlands in County Fermanagh

References 
 Culture Northern Ireland

Townlands of County Fermanagh
Islands of County Fermanagh
Lake islands of Northern Ireland